Gymnostylus is a genus of longhorn beetles of the subfamily Lamiinae, containing the following species:

 Gymnostylus latifrons Breuning, 1970
 Gymnostylus signatus Aurivillius, 1916

References

Pachystolini